Dale B. Hamilton (August 16, 1919 – August 12, 1994) was a professional basketball guard–forward who spent eight seasons in the National Basketball League (NBL) and one season in the National Basketball Association (NBA). In the NBL, Hamilton played for the Hammond Ciesar All-Americans (1939–40), the Fort Wayne Zollner Pistons (1940–45), the Toledo Jeeps (1946–48) and the Waterloo Hawks (1949–50). He played for the Waterloo Hawks once they joined the NBA during the 1949–50 season. He attended Franklin College.

Career statistics

NBA
Source

Regular season

References

External links

1919 births
1994 deaths
American Basketball League (1925–1955) players
Basketball players from Fort Wayne, Indiana
Fort Wayne Zollner Pistons players
Franklin Grizzlies men's basketball players
Hammond Ciesar All-Americans players
Toledo Jeeps players
Undrafted National Basketball Association players
Waterloo Hawks players
American men's basketball players
Forwards (basketball)
Guards (basketball)